The 153rd General Assembly of the U.S. state of Georgia convened its first session on January 12, 2015, at the Georgia State Capitol in Atlanta.  Its second session was January 11 through March 24, 2016.  The 153rd Georgia General Assembly succeeded the 152nd of 2013 and 2014, and preceded the 154th in 2017 and 2018.

Party composition
Of the 180 Georgia State House seats and 56 Georgia State Senate seats, zero changed hands with respect to political party following the 2014 elections.

Senate

House of Representatives

Officers

Senate

Majority leadership

Minority leadership

House of Representatives

Majority leadership

Minority leadership

References

External links
Georgia General Assembly website
2015-2017 Representatives by Name
2015-2017 Senators by Name

Georgia (U.S. state) legislative sessions
2015 in Georgia (U.S. state)
2016 in Georgia (U.S. state)